The Boys' Singles tournament of the 2017 European Junior Badminton Championships was held from April 11-16. Anders Antonsen from Denmark clinched this title in the last edition. Toma Junior Popov from France leads the seedings this year.

Seeded

  Toma Junior Popov (champions)
  Arnaud Merklé (finals)
  Miha Ivanič (fourth round)
  Jan Louda (quarter-finals)
  Nhat Nguyen (quarter-finals)
  Collins Valentine Filimon (fourth round)
  Léo Rossi (quarter-finals)
  Daniel Nikolov (third round)
  Danylo Bosniuk (third round)
  Fabio Caponio (third round)
  Samuel Hsiao (third round)
  Alvaro Vazquez (second round)
  Miguel Rocha (second round)
  David Jones (semi-finals)
  Rok Jercinovic (fourth round)
  Dimitar Yanakiev (second round)

Draw

Finals

Top Half

Section 1

Section 2

Section 3

Section 4

Bottom Half

Section 5

Section 6

Section 7

Section 8

References

External links 
Main Draw

European Junior Badminton Championships